HMS Dundas was a  anti-submarine warfare frigate of the Royal Navy.

Orders and delivery
The Blackwood-class frigates were first ordered in 1951, with Dundas being the first to be commissioned, on 9 March 1956. They were considered to be of limited usage, and best kept for anti-submarine warfare (ASW) duties. Twelve were delivered in total. Dundas was built by JS White and Co Ltd, at Cowes.

Specifications
Dundas had a crew of 140, a displacement of 1,180 tonnes when empty and 1,535 tonnes when full. Her armament included two Mk.NC 10 Limbo 3-barreled ASW mortars and two  torpedo tubes in twin mounts. She was also equipped with sonar and radar.

Service
Dundas appeared in the Ava Gardner film The Little Hut in 1957.

In 1966 Dundas was part of the 2nd Frigate Squadron, based at Portland and used for anti-submarine training.  In that year she was present at Portsmouth Navy Days.  She subsequently completed a 14-month refit at Gibraltar Dockyard and re-commissioned on 21 June 1968. In the same year she took part in Navy Days at Portsmouth Dockyard.

In 1970 she was present at Portsmouth Navy Days, at the time she had just completed a refit in Gibraltar and was still part of the Second Frigate Squadron to help train officers and men in Anti-Submarine Warfare at Portland.

Dundas attended the 1977 Silver Jubilee Fleet Review off Spithead when she was part of the 2nd Frigate Squadron.

Decommissioning and disposal 
A unrepairable propeller shaft knock was discovered when she sailed from Portsmouth, after a brief spell in dry dock she was moved to Chatham dockyard where the entire crew transferred to her sister ship HMS Hardy taking with them anything useful for spares and crew comfort.
Dundas was eventually scrapped in Troon in April 1983.

References

Publications
 
 

 

1953 ships
Blackwood-class frigates
Ships built on the Isle of Wight
Ships of the Fishery Protection Squadron of the United Kingdom